Lord Justice Lloyd may refer to:

 Tony Lloyd, Baron Lloyd of Berwick (born 1929), Lord of Appeal in Ordinary (1993–1998)
 David Lloyd Jones, Lord Lloyd-Jones (born 1952), Lords Justices of Appeal (2012–present)
 Timothy Lloyd (born 1946), Lords Justices of Appeal (2005–2013)